Steve Kahan (born 1939) is a retired American character actor.

Career
Kahan has appeared in many films, most prominently those of director Richard Donner, his late cousin. His best-known film role is in the Lethal Weapon film franchise as Capt. Ed Murphy. His first feature film role was in Donner's Superman (1978) as Armus, a detective tracking Lex Luthor's activity. The character was named after Burton Armus, a technical advisor who worked on the TV show Kojak with Donner.

Kahan's last acting role was in 2006.

Filmography

External links
 

1939 births
Living people
American male film actors
Male actors from New York (state)
Place of birth missing (living people)